The recession index (the R-word index) is an informal index created by The Economist which counts how many stories in The Washington Post and The New York Times use the word “recession” in a quarter.

This simple formula pinpointed the start of recessions in 1981, 1990, and 2001, but was misleading in the early 1990s, when the index indicated a recession for a year after it had officially ended in March 1991.

The index has inspired serious research into testing whether the tone and volume of economic reporting over time has affected people's perceptions. Mark Doms (Federal Reserve Bank of San Francisco) and Norman Morin (Board of Governors of the Federal Reserve System) (2004) created indexes based on the number of articles that contain certain keywords and phrases in the title or first paragraph in the thirty largest newspapers across the US. For instance, the "recession index" is based on the number of articles that mention "recession" or "economic slowdown.".

Sources

References

See also 
 Big Mac Index
 Christmas Price Index
 List of unusual units of measurement
 List of humorous units of measurement

Recessions
Economic indicators
The Economist